North Norfolk is a local government district in Norfolk, England.  Its council is based in Cromer. The population at the 2011 Census was 101,149.

History
The district was formed on 1 April 1974, under the Local Government Act 1972. It was a merger of Cromer Urban District, North Walsham Urban District, Sheringham Urban District, Wells-next-the-Sea Urban District, Erpingham Rural District, Smallburgh Rural District, and Walsingham Rural District. The 2021 census results found that the local authority area had one of the highest proportions of population over 65 in the England and Wales, at 33.5%.

The district was originally to be called Pastonacres, but changed its name by resolution of the council and permission of the Secretary of State for Environment before it formally came into existence on 1 April 1974.

Politics

Elections to the district council are held every four years, with all of the seats on the council up for election every fourth year. The council was run by a Conservative administration, the Conservative party having gained a majority of 8 seats at the 2011 elections, which they increased to 18 at the 2015 elections. However, a series of subsequent by-elections and defections has put the council under No overall control.  The council had previously been under Liberal Democrat control from 2003.

In the 2015 elections, the Conservatives won a second successive term after more than doubling their majority to 18.  The district is run using the Leader and Cabinet model used by the majority of councils in England and Wales, with the current leader Sarah Bütikofer of the Liberal Democrats having taken over in November, 2018.

Historical composition

Composition
The district is entirely parished, and is made up of 121 civil parishes.

The district contains the following civil parishes:

Alby with Thwaite, Aldborough, Antingham, Ashmanhaugh, Aylmerton
Baconsthorpe, Bacton, Barsham, Barton Turf, Beeston Regis, Binham, Blakeney, Bodham, Briningham, Brinton, Briston, Brumstead
Catfield, Cley-Next-The-Sea, Colby, Corpusty, Cromer
Dilham, Dunton
East Beckham, East Ruston, Edgefield, Erpingham
Fakenham, Felbrigg, Felmingham, Field Dalling, Fulmodeston
Gimingham, Great Snoring, Gresham, Guestwick, Gunthorpe
Hanworth, Happisburgh, Helhoughton, Hempstead, Hempton, Hickling, High Kelling, Hindolveston, Hindringham, Holkham, Holt, Honing, Horning, Horsey, Hoveton
Ingham, Ingworth, Itteringham
Kelling, Kettlestone, Knapton
Langham, Lessingham, Letheringsett with Glandford, Little Barningham, Little Snoring, Ludham
Matlaske, Melton Constable, Morston, Mundesley
Neatishead, Northrepps, North Walsham
Overstrand
Paston, Plumstead, Potter Heigham, Pudding Norton
East Raynham, West Raynham, South Raynham, Roughton, West Runton/East Runton, Ryburgh
Salthouse, Scottow, Sculthorpe, Sea Palling, Sharrington, Sheringham, Sidestrand, Skeyton, Sloley, Smallburgh, Southrepps, Stalham, Stibbard, Stiffkey, Stody, Suffield, Sustead, Sutton, Swafield, Swanton Abbott, Swanton Novers
Tatterford, Tattersett, Testerton, Thornage, Thorpe Market, Thurgarton, Thurning, Thursford, Trimingham, Trunch, Tunstead
Upper Sheringham
Walsingham, Warham, Wells-next-the-Sea, West Beckham, Westwick, Weybourne, Wickmere, Wighton, Witton, Wiveton, Wood Norton, Worstead

Controversies 
Almost £389,000 was given to the council's "joint head of paid services", Nick Baker, in the form of an "exit package", reported Private Eye in October 2020.  This was £89,000 more than the council had spent purchasing dwellings to support homeless people in 2019/20, the Eastern Daily Press reported.  The council's opposition leader, Christopher Cushing, was quoted describing the payment to Baker as "extraordinary". The Press also reported the total cost of so-called "golden goodbyes" for senior council staff had risen to £1.8 million.

Cultural references 
The 2013 movie Alan Partridge: Alpha Papa was filmed in the area.

The World of Darkness Parody, Hunter: The Parenting is set in the area.

References

External links

 Visit North Norfolk
 North Norfolk District Council

 North Norfolk Railway
 Gallery of North Norfolk - Photographs of North Norfolk

 North Norfolk Coast Events Calendar

 
Non-metropolitan districts of Norfolk
Natural regions of England